Drinnan is a former village in western Alberta, Canada. It was incorporated as a village on January 1, 1957, but amalgamated with Hinton three months later on April 1, 1957.

The former Village of Drinnan, commonly referred to now as the Hardisty District, is located in the valley portion of Hinton north  of Canadian National Railway and south of the Athabasca River, approximately 5 km east of Hinton's original townsite. The village was centered on Athabasca Avenue and Drinnan Way, just south of Switzer Drive.

Demographics 

Prior to amalgamation with Hinton in 1957, the population of Drinnan was 53 according to the 1956 Census of Canada, up from its 1951 population of 19.

See also 
List of former urban municipalities in Alberta

References 

Former villages in Alberta
Localities in Yellowhead County